Olivees Mountain is the third highest peak on the island of Saint Kitts in the Caribbean.

Geography
It is located within the nation of Saint Kitts and Nevis, in the Lesser Antilles. 

Elevation

It is some 250 metres lower than Mount Liamuiga, which lies six kilometres to the northwest, and is lower than Verchild's Mountain, 4.3 kilometers to the northwest, both on Saint Kitts island.

See also

Mountains of Saint Kitts and Nevis
Saint Kitts (island)